Giovanni Battista Urbani (November 3, 1923 – September 2, 2018) was an Italian communist politician who served as Mayor of Savona from 1957 to 1958, and as a Senator from 1972 to 1987.

Urbani was born in Venice, Italy on November 3, 1923. He would go on to become a professor and Italian Communist politician.

External links 

 Italian Senate Page

References

1923 births
2018 deaths
Mayors of Savona
People from Savona
Italian Communist Party politicians
Politicians from Venice
Democratic Party of the Left politicians
Senators of Legislature VI of Italy
Senators of Legislature VII of Italy
Senators of Legislature VIII of Italy
Senators of Legislature IX of Italy